Roderick Williams (born May 27, 1987) is a former Canadian football defensive back who played in the Canadian Football League (CFL). He won his first Grey Cup championship as a member of the Saskatchewan Roughriders. He played college football for the Alcorn State Braves.

College career
Williams played four seasons at cornerback at Alcorn State and had his best year as a junior, recording 66 tackles, 12 pass breakups and one interception.

Professional career
He signed with the Edmonton Eskimos of the Canadian Football League in June 2010 and was named to the opening day practice roster on June 25, 2010. He played in 12 games, making six starts, before ending the season back on the practice roster. He made 15 starts at cornerback in 2011 and was named a West Division All-Star after recording 44 tackles and six interceptions. Williams started 17 games at cornerback in 2012, sitting out the final regular season game, while also starting in the East Semi-Final.

Williams signed with the Vikings in February 2013, but was released by the club on August 26, 2013 (along with 12 others) to get to a 75-man roster. He then signed with the Saskatchewan Roughriders in September of that year and played with that team for two years.

Upon entering free agency, Williams signed with the Montreal Alouettes on February 20, 2015.
 
Williams retired in April 2015.

References

External links
Montreal Alouettes bio 
Saskatchewan Roughriders bio 
Edmonton Eskimos player bio

1987 births
Living people
American football defensive backs
Canadian football defensive backs
African-American players of American football
African-American players of Canadian football
Alcorn State Braves football players
Edmonton Elks players
Saskatchewan Roughriders players
Montreal Alouettes players
Sportspeople from Monroe, Louisiana
Players of American football from Louisiana
21st-century African-American sportspeople
20th-century African-American people